Kittendorf is a municipality in the Mecklenburgische Seenplatte district, in Mecklenburg-Vorpommern, Germany.

References

External links

 Official website of Kittendorf at www.stavenhagen.de(German)

Municipalities in Mecklenburg-Western Pomerania
Mecklenburgische Seenplatte (district)